Alexander Ellicemay refer to:

 Alexander Ellice (fur trader) (17431805), British merchant who made his fortune in the North American fur trade
 Alexander Ellice (politician) (17911853), British naval officer and Member of Parliament, son of the above